Uerdi Mara (born 30 January 1999) is an Albanian professional footballer who plays as a midfielder for Beroe on loan from Turkish club Ankara Keçiörengücü.

Club career

Early career
Mara started his youth career at KF Skënderbeu Korçë in September 2011. During the 2015–16 season he debuted with the under-17 side, where he played 13 matches and scored also 10 goals. During the season he played a match for the under-19 side before he gained entry also with the first team.

He made it his first professional debut on 12 October 2015 in the 2015–16 Albanian Cup match against Vllaznia Shkodër coming on as a substitute in the 27th minute in place of Bujar Shabani where the match finished in the 1–1 draw.

On 24 May 2016 Mara went to a trial with Primavera team of Italian Serie A side Udinese, where he participated in a friendly tournament Medunarodni Omladinski Turnir in Rijeka, Croatia.

In January 2023, Mara joined First League club Beroe on loan until the end of the season.

International career
Mara was called up for the first time at international level in the Albania national under-17 football team by coach Dzemal Mustedanagić for the two friendly match against Italy U-17 on 17 & 19 March 2015.

He was called up also for a friendly tournament in Austria against Mexico, Austria & Brazil on match-dates 25–27 April 2015. He made it his first international debut against Mexico on 25 April 2015 playing as a starter in the match finished in the 0–0 draw. He played also in the next day against Austria, coming on as a substitute in the 78th minute, where the match finished in the 2–0 loss.

Career statistics

Club

References

External links
 Uerdi Mara profile FSHF.org
 

1999 births
Footballers from Korçë
Living people
Albanian footballers
Association football midfielders
Albania youth international footballers
KF Skënderbeu Korçë players
Ankara Keçiörengücü S.K. footballers
PFC Beroe Stara Zagora players
Kategoria Superiore players
TFF First League players
Albanian expatriate footballers
Expatriate footballers in Turkey
Albanian expatriate sportspeople in Turkey
Expatriate footballers in Bulgaria
Albanian expatriate sportspeople in Bulgaria